The Handball Association of the DPR Korea (HADPRK) is the administrative and controlling body for handball and beach handball in the Democratic People's Republic of Korea. Founded in 1974, HADPRK is a member of Asian Handball Federation (AHF) and the International Handball Federation (IHF).

National teams
 North Korea men's national handball team
 North Korea men's national junior handball team
 North Korea women's national handball team

References

External links
 North Korea at the IHF website.
 North Korea at the AHF website.

Handball in North Korea
Handball
Sports organizations established in 1974
Handball governing bodies
Asian Handball Federation
National members of the International Handball Federation